The Saleslady is a 1916 American drama silent film directed by Frederick A. Thomson and written by Willard Mack. The film stars Hazel Dawn, Irving Cummings, Dorothy Rogers, Clarence Handyside and Arthur Morrison. The film was released on March 23, 1916, by Paramount Pictures.

Plot

Cast 
Hazel Dawn as Helen
Irving Cummings as Bruce
Dorothy Rogers as Lizzie
Clarence Handyside as Bruce's Father
Arthur Morrison as Officer Burke

References

External links 
 

1916 films
1910s English-language films
Silent American drama films
1916 drama films
Paramount Pictures films
American black-and-white films
American silent feature films
Films directed by Frederick A. Thomson
1910s American films